Jesse Maldonado (born September 1, 2002) is an American soccer player who plays as a forward for Monterey Bay FC in the USL Championship.

Career

Youth career
Maldonado played high school soccer at Hamilton High School, where he was named Hamilton Player of the Year in 2018. Maldonado went on to play a single season of college soccer at Yavapai College, making 14 appearances for the Roughriders, scoring ten goals and tallying seven assists. He earned NJCAA Third-Team All-America, First-Team All-Conference, United Soccer Coaches All-Region and First-Team All-Region honors in his freshman year.

In 2021, Maldonado also played in the NPSL with FC Arizona, scoring two goals in seven appearances.

Professional
After playing at a player combine in Arizona, Maldonado was signed by new USL Championship club Monterey Bay on February 11, 2022, ahead of their inaugural season. He made his professional debut on March 12, 2022, appearing as an 85th–minute substitute during a 2–4 loss to Phoenix Rising.

References

2002 births
American soccer players
Association football forwards
College men's soccer players in the United States
FC Arizona players
Living people
Monterey Bay FC players
National Premier Soccer League players
People from Chandler, Arizona
Soccer players from Arizona
USL Championship players